The 2000 All-Ireland Under-21 Hurling Championship was the 37th staging of the All-Ireland Under-21 Hurling Championship, the Gaelic Athletic Association's premier inter-county hurling tournament for players under the age of twenty-one. The championship began on 7 June 2000 and ended on 17 September 2000.

Kilkenny were the defending champions but were defeated by Offaly in the Leinster final.

On 17 September 2000, Limerick won the championship following a 1-13 to 0-13 defeat of Galway in the All-Ireland final. This was their second All-Ireland title and their first since 1987.

Limerick's Mark Keane was the championship's top scorer with 3-34.

Results

Leinster Under-21 Hurling Championship

Quarter-finals

Semi-finals

Final

Munster Under-21 Hurling Championship

Quarter-finals

Semi-finals

Finals

Ulster Under-21 Hurling Championship

Semi-finals

Final

All-Ireland Under-21 Hurling Championship

Semi-finals

Final

Championship statistics

Top scorers

Top scorers overall

Top scorers in a single game

References

Under-21
All-Ireland Under-21 Hurling Championship